Mount Getz is a mountain,  high, in the southern part of the Fosdick Mountains,  east-southeast of Mount Ferranto, in the Ford Ranges of Marie Byrd Land, Antarctica. It was mapped by the United States Antarctic Service (1939–41) led by Rear Admiral Richard E. Byrd, and was named for George F. Getz, Jr., who, like his father, gave financial support toward the exploration efforts of Admiral Byrd.

References

Mountains of Marie Byrd Land